David Richard Swann (born June 19, 1949) is a Canadian medical doctor and politician. He was the leader of the Alberta Liberal Party and Leader of the Opposition in the Alberta Legislature from December 2008 until resigning as party leader in September 2011. He returned as interim leader of the Alberta Liberal Party on February 1, 2015, following the resignation of Raj Sherman and led the party through the 2015 provincial election.

Swann is, to date, the last Liberal elected to the Alberta Legislature.

Family and early life 
Swann was born in Taber, Alberta, and was raised in a middle-class family on the edge of downtown Calgary. His father, Richard Swann, was head of oil and gas exploration for Canadian Fina for many years, before that company was sold to Petro-Canada. His mother Margaret was an active volunteer while raising him and his four siblings.

His summers as a child were spent in the countryside and mountains of Alberta. As he grew up, he worked on farms, at gas plants and hospitals to finance his education.

Swann attended Western Canada High School before entering the University of Alberta in Edmonton in 1967. While at the U of A, he was a member of the Golden Bears Basketball team that went to the national basketball finals in 1969. He is still a sports fan and considers himself an outdoorsman; Swann is a regular runner, biker, hiker and canoeist.

After graduating in Family Medicine in 1975, Swann worked in mission hospitals in South Africa for three years, where he met his future wife, Laureen Ross, also a doctor. There he discovered the deep connection between medicine and politics firsthand. He was deeply affected by the human rights abuses of apartheid, particularly the killing of Steve Biko, who lived near the mission where he worked.

Swann and his wife returned to Canada in 1979, were married and settled in Pincher Creek for seven years. This is where their three children were born, and where he participated in a private medical practice with four other physicians.

In 1984, he began specialty training in Public Health (Prevention) and, after graduating in 1989, co-ordinated a primary health care project for the University of Calgary in the Philippines. After returning to Canada, he joined the Alberta Association of Medical Health Officers, becoming their president in 2000 while serving as Medical Officer of Health for Palliser Health and Headwaters Health regions.

In 2002, the Alberta Society of Health Officers passed a resolution calling for real government action on climate change and reductions to air pollution. Swann supported this resolution, the government fired him from his position with Palliser Health within days. This led to widespread condemnation of the Alberta Environment Minister, Lorne Taylor, who had influenced Health Chairman Len Mitzel to terminate him.

Under intense public pressure, the Palliser Board was forced to offer Swann his job back. He declined, instead making humanitarian trips to Iraq, then returning to Alberta to run in the 2004 provincial election.

Political career 
Swann entered electoral politics as a candidate for the Alberta Liberals. He was elected to the Alberta Legislature in the Alberta general election on November 22, 2004. Along with Harry B. Chase, and Dave Taylor, Swann was part of a re-emergence of provincial Liberals in Calgary which had been completely held by the Progressive Conservatives. During his first term Swann was environment critic and also served as deputy chair of the Standing Committee on Resources and Environment and as a member of the Private Bills Committee and the Standing Committee on Health.  Swann was re-elected in the March 3, 2008 election.

Party leader Kevin Taft resigned following the election in which the party last almost half of its seats. Swann won the subsequent 2008 Alberta Liberal leadership election on December 13, 2008, defeating Dave Taylor and Mo Elsalhy. During his tenure as leader the party continued to suffer from resignations and internal divisions which contributed to it falling to third place in the polls behind the Wildrose Alliance. On February 1, 2011, he announced his resignation as leader with effect after the spring session of the Legislative Assembly. He resigned without having led the party through a general election however, four years later, Swann was given the opportunity to lead the party through an election campaign when party leader Raj Sherman suddenly resigned weeks before the 2015 provincial election was called and Swann was appointed interim leader. In the course of the campaign, Swann's Liberals faced an unexpected surge by the Alberta New Democratic Party under its new leader, Rachel Notley, which threatened to cut into Liberal support, as well as a resurgent Wildrose Party which also resulted in pressure on Liberal supporters to strategically vote for the more moderate Progressive Conservatives in order to block the more right wing Wildrose Party from forming government.

The 2015 election resulted in the defeat of the Progressive Conservatives after 44 years in power and the election of the first NDP government in Alberta history. The Liberals under Swann received 4% of the popular vote, less than half their result in the 2012 election. Only Swann retained his seat becoming the sole Liberal MLA elected, down from 5 Liberal seats.

Advocacy 
Swann has advocated for many causes related to peace and development, human rights and social justice and has worked with organizations such as Physicians for Global Survival, Amnesty International, and Doctors Without Borders.
Swann has been a vocal supporter of farm workers' rights and regularly campaigns for occupational health and safety laws for Alberta's agricultural sector. Swann is the current interim spokesperson for Extinction Rebellion Calgary.

Electoral history

2004 Alberta general election

2008 Alberta general election

2012 Alberta general election

2015 Alberta general election

References

External links 

 Biography for Dr. David Swann on the website of the Legislative Assembly of Alberta
 David Swann website
 David Swann on Alberta Liberal Party website

1949 births
Alberta Liberal Party MLAs
Canadian activists
Canadian environmentalists
Physicians from Alberta
Leaders of the Alberta Liberal Party
Living people
Members of the United Church of Canada
People from Taber, Alberta
Politicians from Calgary
University of Alberta alumni
21st-century Canadian politicians
Canadian public health doctors
Tax resisters